Anjo Buckmann (born 1 March 1989) is a German international rugby union player, playing for the TSV Handschuhsheim in the Rugby-Bundesliga and the German national rugby union team.

Biography 
Buckmann played in the 2010, 2011 and 2012 German championship final for Heidelberger RK, with the club winning all of them. He made his debut for Germany in a friendly against Hong Kong on 12 December 2009.

Buckmann left the TSV Handschuhsheim at the end of the 2008-09 season to join the Heidelberger RK. He was part of a group of German players which were sent to South Africa in 2009 to improve their rugby skills at the  Academy as part of the Wild Rugby Academy program.

Buckman competed for Germany at the 2022 Rugby World Cup Sevens in Cape Town.

Honours

Club
 German rugby union championship
 Winners: 2010, 2011, 2012
 German rugby union cup
 Champions: 2010, 2011
 Runners up: 2009

Stats
Anjo Buckmann's personal statistics in club and international rugby:

Club

 As of 11 May 2012

National team

European Nations Cup

Friendlies & other competitions

 As of 28 April 2013

References

External links
 Anjo Buckmann at scrum.com
   Anjo Buckman at totalrugby.de
  Anjo Buckmann at the DRV website

1989 births
Living people
German rugby union players
Germany international rugby union players
TSV Handschuhsheim players
Heidelberger RK players
Rugby union centres